This is a list of the heads of state of Tanzania, from the independence of Tanganyika in 1961 to the present day.

From 1961 to 1962 the head of state under the Constitution of 1961 was the Queen of Tanganyika, Elizabeth II, who was also the Queen of the United Kingdom and the other Commonwealth realms. The monarch was represented in Tanganyika by a governor-general. Tanganyika became a republic within the Commonwealth under the Constitution of 1962 and the monarch and governor-general were replaced by an executive president. After the Zanzibar Revolution, which overthrew the Sultanate of Zanzibar in January 1964, the People's Republic of Zanzibar and Pemba united with mainland Tanganyika to form the United Republic of Tanganyika and Zanzibar, which was later renamed to the United Republic of Tanzania.

Monarch (1961–1962)
The succession to the throne was the same as the succession to the British throne.

Governor-general
The governor-general was the representative of the monarch in Tanganyika and exercised most of the powers of the monarch. The governor-general was appointed for an indefinite term, serving at the pleasure of the monarch. Since Tanganyika was granted independence by the Tanganyika Independence Act 1961, rather than being first established as a semi-autonomous dominion and later promoted to independence as defined by the Statute of Westminster 1931, the governor-general was to be always appointed solely on the advice of the Cabinet of Tanganyika without the involvement of the British government. As Tanganyika became a republic before Richard Turnbull, the former colonial governor, was replaced, this has never happened. In the event of a vacancy the chief justice would have served as the officer administering the government.

Status

President of Tanganyika
Under the Constitution of 1962, the first constitution of the Republic of Tanganyika, the president replaced the monarch as executive head of state. In the event of a vacancy the Vice-President of Tanganyika served as acting president.

Status

President of Tanzania
Under the Constitution of 1964, the first constitution of the United Republic of Tanzania, the president replaced the president of Tanganyika and the president of Zanzibar as executive head of state. The president was elected by a yes-or-no confirmation referendum for a five-year term after being nominated by a TANU/CCM electoral college. Following the restoration of a multi-party system in 1992, multi-candidate elections were introduced in 1995, with the president elected via First-past-the-post voting. In the event of a vacancy the vice-president serves as president for the remainder of the presidential term.

Former President John Magufuli took a monthly salary of 9 million Tanzanian shillings (approximately USD $4,000).

Status

Notes

Timeline

Standards

References

External links
 World Statesmen – Tanzania
 Rulers.org – Tanzania

Government of Tanzania
H
 
Tanzania
Tanzania and the Commonwealth of Nations